Michael Alter is an American businessman who is the president and owner of the Alter Group, a commercial real estate developer.

Career

The group won the Beyond the Box: Exceptional Industrial Projects award for its development of the Thomson Learning Distribution Center.

Alter is founder and president of City Year Chicago, whose signature program is the City Year Youth Service Corps. The goal in the program is to bring together approximately 1,000 people ranging in age from 17–24 from diverse backgrounds and put them through a full-time commitment of a year of community service, leadership development, and civic engagement where they mentor children.

In 2005, he became the principal owner and chairman of the WNBA team: the Chicago Sky.

In 2009, he was part of an investment team that purchased The New Republic, one of the nation's oldest political and cultural magazines.

In 2021, he was sanctioned by the city of Chicago's ethics board for unregistered lobbying of Mayor Lori Lightfoot, and paid a $5000 fine.

Education
Alter has a Bachelor of Arts degree in government from Harvard University and a J.D. degree from the University of Chicago Law School. He and his wife Ellen are parents of three children. They live in Winnetka, Illinois.

References

External links
The New Republic 

Women's National Basketball Association executives
Chicago Sky owners
Harvard College alumni
University of Chicago Law School alumni
American real estate businesspeople
New Trier High School alumni
Living people
The New Republic people
Year of birth missing (living people)